Bhakti Ballabh Tirtha (24 April 1924 - 21 April 2017) was a disciple of Bhakti Dayita Madhava and an acharya and initiating spiritual master (Sri Guru) in the Gaudiya Math following the philosophy of the Bhakti marg, specifically of Caitanya Mahaprabhu and Gaudiya Vaishnava theology. He was the President Acharya of Sree Chaitanya Gaudiya Math, headquartered at Kolkata, West Bengal, India and having more than 22 branches in India. He was president of the World Vaisnava Association and founder of GOKUL (Global organization for Krishna Chaitanya's Universal Love).

He wrote extensively in Bengali, Hindi, and English. His most read and referenced book is Sri Caitanya and His Associates, which details the lives of an entire lineage of Gaudiya Vaishnava spiritual leaders, from the 10th century to the present day.

Bhakti Ballabh Tirtha died on April 21, 2017, at the Sree Caitanya Gaudiya Math Temple, Kolkata. His samadhi was installed on April 22 in the holy city of Mayapur at Sree Chaitanya Gaudiya math, Mayapur.

Early life
He was born on 13 April 1924, on the day of Ram Navami, in Goalpara, Assam, India. He is a disciple of Bhakti Dayita Madhava, who founded Sree Chaitanya Gaudiya Math in 1953. He was appointed as the president for Sree Chaitanya Gaudiya Math in 1979. He also serves as the president of the World Vaishnava Association (WVA).

He travelled and spread the teachings of Chaitanya Mahaprabhu around the world. He is among the most read masters in the speaking tree initiative of The Times of India.

Bhakti Ballabh Tirtha Maharaj left the world on the night of April 20, 2017 at his temple in the city of Calcutta in the Indian state of West Bengal. On April 22 a large procession was carried out from Calcutta to the city of Mayapur in the same state. In the temple of Sri Chaitanya Gaudiya Math the Vedic rituals pertinent to the Rupanuga branch were finally carried out and their body was covered with lime and a temple known as "samadhi" will be built there.

Publications 
One of the major contributions of Srila Bhakti Ballabh Tirtha Maharaj are the books authored by him. His books are based on Vedic scriptures and are clear reflections of the teachings of Chaitanya Mahaprabhu and of Gaudiya Vaishnavism. Below is the list of his books:
 Sri Chaitanya: His Life and Associates
 Dasavatara This is a commentary on the Ten Manifestations of Sri Vishnu, described in Gita Govinda, composed by Jayadeva Goswami.
 Sages of ancient India
 A Taste of Transcendence
 Sudha Bhakti
 Affectionately Yours-Divine Letters This book is an extensive collection of letters (1981-2012) written by Bhakti Ballabh Tirtha to his disciples as a response to their spiritual inquiries.
 Sages, Saints and Kings of Ancient India  This book is a compilation of pastimes of legendary personalities from Vedic Scriptures such as Bhagavata Purana, Mahabharata and Ramayana.
 Harikatha And Vaishnava Aparadha
 Nectar Of Harikatha
 Path of Pure Devotion

Footnotes

References

External links 
 http://trove.nla.gov.au/result?q=creator%3A%22Bhakti+Ballabha+Ti%CC%84rtha.%22
 http://www.nineislandspress.org/A-Life-Of-Devotion/ 
 http://www.spiritualbangalore.com/why-we-need-to-remember-god-by-b-b-tirtha-maharaj-president-all-india-sree-chaitanya-gaudiya-math/
 http://www.wva-vvrs.org/pbook/pkb16.htm
 http://www.gokul.org.uk/
 http://www.bvml.org/SBBTM/
 http://vanisource.org/wiki/750902_-_Letter_to_Bhakti_Ballabh_Tirtha_written_from_Vrndavana
 http://oldchakra.com/2002/03/24/tkg.by.bhakti.ballabh.tirtha.sw/print.htm
 http://vaishnava-news-network.org/world/WD0204/WD24-7283.html
http://vinacc.blogspot.com.co/2017/04/srila-b-b-tirtha-goswami-maharaj.html

Further reading 
 https://web.archive.org/web/20160419031717/http://www.trilokanath.com/Gokul/Articles/ArticleBBTirthaGita.htm
 http://iskconnews.org/vaishnavism-tarnished-month-of-purushottama-is-celebrated-as-most-holy,112/

1924 births
2017 deaths
20th-century Hindu philosophers and theologians
21st-century Hindu philosophers and theologians
20th-century Hindu religious leaders
21st-century Hindu religious leaders
Gaudiya religious leaders
Indian Hindu religious leaders
Indian Hindu missionaries
Indian theologians
Indian Vaishnavites
Presidents of religious organizations
University of Calcutta alumni
People from Goalpara district